Bethel Township is an inactive township in Shelby County, in the U.S. state of Missouri.

Bethel Township was erected in the 1840s, and named after the community of Bethel, Missouri.

References

Townships in Missouri
Townships in Shelby County, Missouri